East Roberts Hall was a building on the campus of Cornell University in Ithaca, New York, which opened on Wednesday, October 10, 1906. Originally just referred to as the Dairy Building, it was not called East Roberts Hall until 1923 when other departments moved in and the Dairy Department moved out and into the new Dairy Building. East Roberts Hall was demolished along with Roberts and Stone Halls ca 1987-1988. 

It was listed on the U.S. National Register of Historic Places in 1984.

See also
 Roberts Hall 
 Stone Hall

References

University and college buildings on the National Register of Historic Places in New York (state)
School buildings on the National Register of Historic Places in New York (state)
Cornell University buildings
School buildings completed in 1906
National Register of Historic Places in Tompkins County, New York
1906 establishments in New York (state)